Burgruine Petersberg is a castle in Friesach, Carinthia, Austria.

Today the castle is home to the Friesach City Museum, which features exhibits about the town's history, culture, mining industry and trade.

See also
List of castles in Austria

External links
 Burgenwelt
 Friesach City Museum 

This article was initially translated from the German Wikipedia.

Castles in Carinthia (state)
Museums in Carinthia (state)
Local museums in Austria